Hewins is an unincorporated community in Chautauqua County, Kansas, United States.

History
Hewins was named after Edwin M. Hewins, a rancher and member of the Kansas Legislature.

The post office was established April 4, 1906, and closed April 8, 1966.

References

Further reading

 Heer, Esther Leonard. From Whence We Came: A Little History of Hewins, Kansas. Arrow Press: San Antonio, 1983.

External links
 Chautauqua County maps: Current, Historic, KDOT

Unincorporated communities in Chautauqua County, Kansas
Unincorporated communities in Kansas